The Pamoja African Alliance (PAA) is a political party in Kenya. It is led by Amason Kingi.

History 
In May 2022, the party left Kenya Kwanza and joined the Azimio La Umoja alliance. It contested the August 2022 general election and won 4 seats in the National Assembly.

References

See also 

 List of political parties in Kenya

Political parties in Kenya